Peter Trainor Kelly (died 1948) was an Irish politician. He was an independent member of Seanad Éireann from 1938 to 1948. He was first elected to the 3rd Seanad in 1938 by the Industrial and Commercial Panel. He was re-elected at the 1943 and 1944 Seanad elections but lost his seat at the 1948 election.

References

Year of birth missing
1948 deaths
Members of the 3rd Seanad
Members of the 4th Seanad
Members of the 5th Seanad
Independent members of Seanad Éireann